Lumun (Lomon), also Kuku-Lumun, is a Niger–Congo language in the Talodi family spoken in the Nuba Mountains, Sudan.

Lumun is spoken in Canya’ru, Toromathan, and To’ri villages.

Further reading
Smits, Heleen. 2007. Noun and noun phrase in Lumun (Kordofanian). M.A. thesis, Leiden University.
Smits, Heleen. 2011. Lumun noun classes and number. In Raija Kramer, Holger Trobs & Raimund Kastenholz (eds.), Afrikanische Sprachen im Fokus. Linguistische Beitrage zum 19. Afrikanistentag, Mainz, 8.-10. April 2010, pp. 271-283. Cologne: Rüdiger Köppe.
Smits, Heleen. 2012. The prefix /ɔ́-/ in Lumun kinship terms and personal names. Occasional Papers in the study of Sudanese Languages 10:95-113.
Smits, Heleen. 2013. The locative-applicative suffix in Lumun. In Roger Blench & Thilo Schadeberg (eds), Nuba Mountain Language Studies. Cologne: Rüdiger Köppe. pp.219-236.

References

External links 
 

Definitely endangered languages
Talodi languages